Stuart Little 3: Call of the Wild is a 2005 American computer-animated comedy film directed by Audu Paden, distributed by Sony Pictures Home Entertainment. It was released on DVD in other countries in 2005, until it was eventually released in North America on February 21, 2006. It is the third and final installment in the Stuart Little trilogy and a stand-alone sequel to Stuart Little 2. In the film, Stuart and his family spend their summer vacation in a cabin near Lake Garland. During the vacation, Stuart befriends an anthropomorphic skunk named Reeko, and the family cat Snowbell is taken by a mysterious beast.

Unlike its predecessors, which utilized a blend of CGI and live-action, Stuart Little 3: Call of the Wild is fully CGI animated. It is also the only film in the series to not have a theatrical release, instead being released direct to video.

Michael J. Fox, Geena Davis and Hugh Laurie reprise their roles as Stuart Little, Eleanor Little and Frederick Little, while Snowbell, George and Monty are now voiced by Kevin Schon, Corey Padnos and Rino Romano (replacing Nathan Lane, Jonathan Lipnicki and Steve Zahn who previously portrayed and voiced them in the live-action films.)

Plot

Sometime after the events of the previous film, Stuart, Snowbell, and the Littles leave New York City to go on a summer camping trip near Lake Garland in the countryside. Stuart expresses interest in joining a group called the Lake Scouts to his parents, but is rebuffed by his mother Eleanor, who soon changes her mind once being informed by Frederick that he will watch over him. Upon arriving, George becomes infatuated with a girl named Brooke, who introduces him and Stuart to the Lake Scouts, led by their leader Troopmaster Bickle, along with Frederick, who works out an assistant position with him. Brooke also gives them information about "The Beast", a supposed wild animal in the forest surrounding Lake Garland that is said to be extremely fearsome, savage and powerful while claiming that its favorite prey is cats. Upon hearing this, Snowbell becomes frightened and is determined to avoid the Beast at all costs.

Stuart and George join the Scouts. However, Stuart fails the skill assessment test (where the Scouts have to row canoes from the dock to shore) after his canoe is punctured by a fish thus meaning no gold kerchief for him. Elsewhere, Reeko, a smooth-talking anthropomorphic skunk who is generally disliked by the local fauna of Lake Garland, is on a mission to give food to the Beast, who serves as his master and is revealed to be a ruthless female puma who strikes fear into the forest animals and forces them to give her food. Unfortunately one night, Reeko shows up without any tribute and brings his way out with a promise of bringing double his quota next time.

During a hike the next day, George is shown to be skilled at scouting, but Stuart has trouble keeping up due to his small stature and ends up lost. Along the way, he comes across Reeko, who he mistakenly believes is the Beast, only for both of them to be suddenly attacked by the real Beast, who chases them until they eventually lose her. Meanwhile, Snowbell discovers that his alley cat friend Monty is living under the Littles' cabin, revealing he had stowed away by sneaking into the trunk of their car unnoticed. He decides to make Monty a "lookout" for the Beast, in exchange for food. While struggling with the tasks and activities that the Scouts are performing, Stuart makes a deal with Reeko that he will help him learn the ways of the forest which he accepts, causing a friendship to eventually form between the two.

That evening, Stuart invites Reeko over to dinner and introduces him to the Little family. Upon leaving the Littles' cabin, Reeko, deciding that the food given to him isn't enough to appease the Beast, finds Snowbell, where he attempts to persuade him to come into the forest at night for a supposed "party". At first, Snowbell refuses, but Reeko lies to him by saying that all of the stories about the Beast are false. That night, Snowbell enters the woods believing it to be a party, only for him to get captured by the Beast herself. Upon having observed Snowbell getting kidnapped, Stuart attempts to tell his parents, George and the Scouts the truth about his friend getting captured the next morning, but none of them believe him, thinking Stuart was just dreaming the whole time and telling him that the Beast was only from a story.

With no choice, Stuart goes off to rescue Snowbell on his own, but learns along the way that Reeko was in cahoots with the Beast and responsible for Snowbell's disappearance the previous night before disowning him as his friend, damaging their friendship. After taking Snowbell to her lair, the Beast notices his fur and attempts to kill him so she can make a rug out of him, but temporarily spares his life when Snowbell instead suggests that she can fatten him up first to make a much larger rug. The Beast then proceeds to imprison Snowbell in a deep pit before fattening him up by feeding him a revolting variety of insects and leaves. Meanwhile, Eleanor realizes that Stuart is missing upon finding a note left by him and rallies a search party with Frederick and the Scouts.

Eventually, Stuart reaches the Beast's cave, where he is able to sneak past her and rescue Snowbell from the pit. On their way out, Stuart and Snowbell find themselves blocked by the Beast, whom Stuart overwhelms with salt and pepper before he and Snowbell escape and build a trap covered with leaves and sticks, knowing the Beast will fall through it just as she catches up to them. However, after discovering the trap and then attempting to devour Stuart, the Beast is confronted by Reeko, who, having realized the error of his ways, shows up along with the forest animals, who have decided to support him upon having a change of heart. Reeko incapacitates the Beast by spraying at her, allowing the forest animals to distract her long enough for Stuart and Snowbell to lure her into their trap, whereupon she falls through it and is finally captured. Later that night, Stuart and Snowbell are found by the Littles and the Scouts, whereupon Stuart shows them the Beast, proving to them that she was real the whole time.

The next day, while the Beast is taken away by authorities, Stuart earns a gold kerchief, which signifies excellence as a scout, from Troopmaster Bickle for his bravery. As Stuart's family is packing up ready to leave, Snowbell discovers Monty alive and well after he mistakenly thought that he was killed by the Beast. It turned out Monty just went for a walk, but is now overweight due to having consumed a lot of food. George gives his game console to Brooke to remember him while Brooke in return kisses him on the cheek. Meanwhile, Stuart regains his friendship with Reeko, who apologizes to Stuart for his actions, telling him that he was wrong to betray the only friend he had. Stuart then hugs Reeko and bids him farewell before he, Snowbell, Monty and the Littles return to New York City.

Voice cast

Michael J. Fox as Stuart Little, a young anthropomorphic mouse adopted as part of the Little family.
Geena Davis as Mrs. Eleanor Little, the mother of the Little family and Frederick's wife.
Hugh Laurie as Mr. Frederick Little, the father of the Little family and Eleanor's husband.
Corey Padnos as George Little, the eldest son of the Little family and Stuart's older brother.
Wayne Brady as Reeko, a smooth-talking anthropomorphic skunk and the Beast's former servant who befriends Stuart, but is disliked by the forest animals because of his attitude.
Kevin Schon as Snowbell, the family's Persian cat who is Stuart's friend.
Virginia Madsen as the Beast, a ferocious and ruthless female puma, Reeko's master and the tyrannical ruler of the forest of Lake Garland.
Peter MacNicol as Troopmaster Bickle, the slightly overweight, clumsy, comical, yet well-intentioned leader of the Lake Scouts.
Rino Romano as Monty, Snowbell's gray tabby cat friend.
Tara Strong as Brooke, an experienced Lake Scout at Lake Garland who is George's love interest.
Charlie Adler as Beaver, a beaver and one of the forest animals of Lake Garland who dislikes Reeko.
Kath Soucie as Cottontail, a rabbit and one of the forest animals of Lake Garland who dislikes Reeko.
Additional voices include Garry Chalk, Tom Kenny, Sophia Paden, Kath Soucie and Tara Strong.

Reception
Unlike the first two films, which were positively received, this film received generally negative reviews. James Plath of Reels.com rated it 2.5 out of 4, saying "Kids will still like it because the storyline is engaging, the color palette is bright and cheery, the songs are upbeat and pleasant enough, and the messages about good behavior, perseverance, and belonging are worthwhile." Sloan Freer of Radiotimes.com rated it 2 out of 5, saying, "The quality plunges drastically in this uninspired direct-to-video sequel. Gone is the charming mix of live action and CGI used in the original two films, replaced by full animation whose flatness and simplicity is symbolic of the entire tale. Surprisingly, the core voice talent remains the same with Michael J Fox, Geena Davis, and Hugh Laurie wasting their efforts on a weak plot that sees boy mouse Stuart demonstrate his bravery when Snowbell the family cat is kidnapped during the Little clan's lakeside vacation. Undemanding humour, a sprinkling of mild peril, and the obligatory life lessons offer enough substance to keep the very young happy, but only the short running time will impress anyone older."

Home media
The film was released on VHS and DVD. One DVD also came with a Stuart Little key chain.

The film grossed $11.7 million in DVD sales in the United States.

The DVD had a number of special features, these being "Help Stuart Escape!", a memory game regarding the events of the movie, "Monty's Monstrous Appetite", another memory game where you have to give Monty the right food, "Stuart's Summer Journal", the events of the movie encapsulated as entries in Stuart's journal, "Learn To Draw", which had step by step guides to drawing characters from the movie, and Stuart Little 3: Big Photo Adventure, which showed the trailer to the PlayStation 2 game of the same name.

References

External links

 
 

2005 direct-to-video films
2005 computer-animated films
2005 directorial debut films
2000s American animated films
2000s children's animated films
American direct-to-video films
American computer-animated films
American sequel films
Direct-to-video animated films
Direct-to-video sequel films
Animated films about cats
Animated films based on children's books
Films about cougars
Animated films about mice
Films about skunks
Films about vacationing
Films based on novels by E. B. White
Films produced by Douglas Wick
Films produced by Lucy Fisher
Films scored by Atli Örvarsson
Sony Pictures direct-to-video films
Stuart Little (franchise)
Rainmaker Studios films
2005 films
2000s English-language films